Lerch Bates is an international consulting services company  specializing in the design and management of building systems with 36 offices in North America, Europe, the Middle East and India. Founded in 1947, focused on elevator consulting, they work with architects, developers, building investors, owners and managers on the design, sustainability and continuous use of building systems

Specific services offered include: planning and design (including CAD), survey and evaluation of existing systems and equipment, contracting management, development of specifications, bidding assistance and negotiation, project management and administration, testing, and training.

Projects

Some of the buildings and projects that Lerch Bates has contributed to:

Burj Khalifa, Dubai
Freedom Tower, New York City
201 Bishopsgate, London
Petronas Towers, Kuala Lumpur
Taipei 101, Taipei
Russia Tower, Moscow
Bank of China Tower, Hong Kong
Trump International Hotel and Tower, Dubai
Signature Tower, Nashville
Moscow City Tower, Moscow
Marina 101, Dubai
Indira Gandhi International Airport, New Delhi
Google Headquarters, Mountain View

Company history

In 1947, Charles W. Lerch started a company performing maintenance and repairs, C. W. Lerch Co, (widely accepted as the first independent elevator consulting company) in Chicago. He later added elevator consulting as a side business. In 1964 Charles W. Lerch was joined by Vane Q. Bates and both men working full-time on elevator consulting. The firm moved to its offices to Denver, Colorado that same year and officed downtown in the Patterson Building on 17th Street (since demolished).  The Company moved a number of times but has maintained its HQ in and around Denver.  In 1974 the company was incorporated as Lerch Bates & Associates and by the 1980s building boom, and under the leadership of Quent Bates (CW Lerch having died in the early 1980s)  Lerch Bates had 15 offices in North America. In 1985 Lerch Bates Limited in London was formed and in 1990 it created the first "Performance Related" maintenance contact, which related equipment downtime and traffic performance to maintenance premiums. In 1994 under the direction of Quent Bates and his quest to reward the employees, Lerch Bates became an employee owned company and is now considered one of the best and longest running ESOP's in the US. In 1998 Lerch Bates designed the world's fastest elevators for the then world's tallest building, the Taipei Financial Centre / Taipei 101.

References

External links
 Lerch Bates Corporate Website

Design companies established in 1947
Engineering consulting firms of the United States
International engineering consulting firms
1947 establishments in Illinois